Ariaspis is an extinct genus of cyathaspidiform heterostracan agnathan.  Fossils are found in marine strata of Canada and Europe from the late Silurian period until its extinction during the Early Devonian. A new species, A. arctata, was described by David K. Elliott and Sandra Swift in 2010.

References

Cyathaspidiformes genera
Devonian jawless fish
Silurian jawless fish
Silurian first appearances
Early Devonian genus extinctions
Cyathaspidida
Silurian fish of North America
Silurian fish of Europe
Paleozoic life of the Northwest Territories